Donja Ljuboviđa is a village in Serbia. It is situated in the Ljubovija municipality, in the Mačva District of Central Serbia. The village had a Serb ethnic majority and a population of 951.  There were 143 Romani living in this village in 2002; it is the largest proportion of the minority in the Ljubovija municipality.

Historical population

1948: 1,522
1953: 1,546
1961: 1,457
1971: 1,156
1981: 1,096
1991: 965
2002: 951

References

See also
List of places in Serbia

Populated places in Mačva District
Ljubovija